In late 2007 (or 2009) CNES (the French Space Agency) and ESA (the European Space Agency) had planned to send a remote sensing orbiter and four small Netlanders to Mars. They planned to land them in four different locations. The CNES and ESA cancelled this mission because it was too expensive; both agencies planned to send other orbiters and landers for missions like ExoMars.

The Landers' mission was to take pictures of the landing site and explore Mars' internal surface and atmosphere.  Each of the four landers was to carry instruments for the following measurements:
 Seismometer, IPG, France
 Panoramic camera, DLR, Germany
 Atmospheric sensors, FMI, Finland
 Atmospheric electricity sensor, CETP, France
 geodesic and ionospheric measurements, GRGS, France
 Soil properties measurements, University of Münster, Germany
 Ground Penetrating Radar, CETP, France
 Magnetometer, CETP, France
 Microphone, University of California, Berkeley, USA

The Orbiter's mission was to take pictures from orbit, explore Mars' atmosphere and relay information and images from the Netlanders.

The MetNet multi-lander mission to Mars is based on the legacy of NetLander. MetNet is scheduled for launches in 2011–2019.

The NetLander design has been examined as the basis for a small Solar System body lander, such as a comet.

References

See also
ExoMars (Europes big Mars mission in the 2010s)

Missions to Mars
Cancelled spacecraft
European Space Agency space probes